Guckert is a surname. Notable people with the surname include:

Elmer Guckert (1929–2013), American baseball umpire
Elroy Guckert (1900–1940), American football and basketball coach, college athletics administrator, and professor

See also
Zuckert